WinCDEmu is an open-source utility for mounting disk image files in Microsoft Windows. It installs a Windows device driver which allows a user to access an image of a CD or DVD as if it were a physical drive. WinCDEmu supports ISO, CUE/BIN, CCD/IMG, NRG, MDS/MDF and RAW formats.

Language support
WinCDEmu supports 38 languages:

Arabic, Bengali, Bulgarian, Catalan, Chinese Simplified, Chinese Traditional, Danish, Dutch, English, Estonian, Persian, Finnish, French, German, Greek, Hebrew, Hungarian, Italian, Japanese, Korean, Lithuanian, Macedonian, Malaysian, Norwegian, Polish, Portuguese (Brazil), Portuguese, Romanian, Russian, Slovak, Spanish, Serbian, Swedish, Taiwanese, Tamil, Turkish, Ukrainian, Uzbek

External links

References

2008 software
Disk image emulators
Free software